HMS Lion was a  light cruiser of the British Royal Navy, originally ordered in 1942 as one of the  and laid down that same year as Defence by Scotts Shipbuilding and Engineering Company at Greenock in Scotland on 6 June 1942.

Work was stopped and not begun again until the mid-1950s for completion as an air-defence cruiser pending the introduction of guided missile-equipped s into the navy. She was commissioned in 1960. All three Tigers were to be converted into helicopter carriers but Lion was placed into reserve in 1965 and served as a supply of spares for the other two until decommissioned in 1972 followed by selling for scrap in 1975.

Design and construction
Partially complete, Lion was launched on 2 September 1944 by Lady Edelson, but work was suspended in 1946. The cruiser was further advanced than the two other Tigers and its completion as HMS Defence in 1947 was anticipated. New Mk 24 triple six inch turrets for  fourTiger-class ships, including HMS Hawke, scrapped nearly ready to launch in 1947 were 75-80% complete. But a final decision was made in 1954 to fit more advanced fully automatic Mk 26 DP twin 6 inch turrets. The Mk 26 had a theoretical rate of fire of 17-20rpm and HMS Lion was fitted with one hydraulic version of the MK 26 and one of electric version of the turret, in A & Y, with far higher elevation and training speed. The original planned fit of 3 electric Mk 24 turrets in A, B and Y would have given more reliable all angle surface cover against multiple target and were credited with differing rates of fire by different sources, some giving 10-12rpm. The Turrets actually built originally for the Tiger class, HMS Hawke and possibly alternatively a cancelled class of 3 Improved Improved Belfast or Interim Neptune class which engines, boilers and hulls may have been under construction in 1944-46 as the Tiger class construction was suspended from about the time of HMS Defence/ HMS Lion launch in 1944 to VE day and Australia was negotiating the transfer or purchase of HMS Defence and HMS Blake from 2/44 to 6/45 in offers which did not include Mk23 or the Mk24 turrets and would have seen the cruisers armed with Bellona or N2 class twin RP10 5.25. The Mk 25 twin 6 inch was simply a more automated version of the LA 60 degree triple 6 inch MK 24 and was never actually built.  Still named Defence, she was laid up at Gareloch, a Scottish loch, for 8 years in dehumidified sealed state in official RN reserve, while the other incomplete Tigers remained with their builders. By 1954 the condition of HMS Defence "was not so good", but it was felt Defence, Blake, and Tiger could still be completed, with new armament in three years at a cost of 6 million pounds. While construction of equivalent new cruisers would cost 12 million pounds and take 5 years. Construction of Defence and two other cruisers was resumed to a revised  design. Defence was renamed Lion in 1957 and construction continued at the Swan Hunter and Wigham Richardson yards at Wallsend on the Tyne. Its final cost was 13 million pounds.

Service history
She was finally commissioned in July 1960, having been rushed into service with some shortcuts in the engineering department, due to political pressure to get her to sea. Initial trials were disrupted by severe rotor, turbine and vibration problems and a further three months in Portsmouth dockyard were required before she became fully operational in February 1961.

Lions first commission included a Mediterranean leg covering some 20,500 miles in 1961. In the latter part of that year she headed to South America and returned to Plymouth in 1962.

Lion recommissioned at Devonport for service in the Home Fleet and Far East on 31 July 1962 and sailed to the Mediterranean for work-up at the end of November. She reached the Far East in March 1963 and was present at the Malaya independence celebrations in September. She subsequently visited Australia before returning to the UK via the Suez Canal. In early 1964, Lion took part in major NATO and other national exercises; she then visited Spain and Portugal before returning to the UK.

In September 1964 Lion was present at the Maltese independence celebrations. Earlier that year she had been rammed under the Forth Road Bridge by the frigate . Emergency repairs were carried out in Rosyth dockyard before she sailed for Malta with only hours to spare. Early in 1965, Lion was present at the Gambian independence ceremony on Bathurst, now Banjul. Later that year, she was flagship of a small force for an official visit to Sweden. The ship was present at Portsmouth Navy Days in August 1965, before being decommissioned into the reserve at Devonport until 1972, when she was placed on the disposal list.

On 15 May 1973, she arrived at Rosyth and was subsequently stripped of parts and equipment for use in Tiger and Blake. Lion was sold for breaking up on 12 February 1975 for £262,500. On 24 April 1975 she arrived at Inverkeithing where she was scrapped by ship breakers Thos. W. Ward. Some equipment from her was salvaged and sold to Peru for use in their former British cruisers.

Commanding officers

Notes

References

External links
HMS Lion at Uboat.net
A history of the Tiger class

 

Tiger-class cruisers
Ships built on the River Clyde
1944 ships
Ships built on the River Tyne
Cold War cruisers of the United Kingdom